The 1999 Northern Arizona Lumberjacks football team was an American football team that represented Northern Arizona University (NAU) as a member of the Big Sky Conference (Big Sky) during the 1999 NCAA Division I-AA football season. In their second year under head coach Jerome Souers, the Lumberjacks compiled an 8–4 record (6–2 against conference opponents), outscored opponents by a total of 409 to 370, and tied for second place in the Big Sky. The Lumberjacks were invited to play in the NCAA Division I-AA Football Championship playoffs, where they lost in the first round to eventual national champion Georgia Southern by a 72–29 score.

This dropped their overall record to 4–8 and put them in the last-place tie in the Big Sky at 2–6.

The team played its home games at the J. Lawrence Walkup Skydome, commonly known as the Walkup Skydome, in Flagstaff, Arizona.

Schedule

References

Northern Arizona
Northern Arizona Lumberjacks football seasons
Northern Arizona Lumberjacks football